John Showalter may refer to:

John William Showalter (1844–1898), United States federal judge
John Showalter (director), American television director